Jenness Pond is a  water body located primarily in Rockingham County in southern New Hampshire, United States, in the town of Northwood. A small portion of the pond at its northwest end lies in Pittsfield in Merrimack County. The pond's outlet, Jenness Brook (called Narrows Brook farther downstream), is a feeder of Northwood Lake, part of the Suncook River / Merrimack River / Gulf of Maine watershed.

The lake is classified as a warmwater fishery and contains largemouth and smallmouth bass, chain pickerel, and horned pout.

See also

List of lakes in New Hampshire

References

Lakes of Merrimack County, New Hampshire
Lakes of Rockingham County, New Hampshire
Lakes of New Hampshire